Bütschwil-Ganterschwil is a municipality in the Wahlkreis (constituency) of Toggenburg in the canton of St. Gallen in Switzerland.  On 1 January 2013 the former municipalities of Bütschwil and Ganterschwil merged to form the new municipality of Bütschwil-Ganterschwil.

History
Bütschwil is first mentioned in 779 as Bucinesvilare.

Ganterschwil is first mentioned in 779 as Cantrichesuilare.

Geography

Of this area, 66.3% is used for agricultural purposes, while 19.8% is forested. Of the rest of the land, 12.4% is settled (buildings or roads) and the remainder (1.5%) is non-productive (rivers or lakes). The former municipality is located along the Thur river. On the left bank of the Thur, it consists of the linear villages of Bütschwil and Dietfurt and the hamlets of Grämigen, Tierhag, Feld, Kengelbach and Zwiselen. While on the right bank are the hamlets of Langensteig and Laufen.

Of this area, 63.8% is used for agricultural purposes, while 26.2% is forested. Of the rest of the land, 7% is settled (buildings or roads) and the remainder (3%) is non-productive (rivers or lakes). The former municipality is located on a high plateau between the Thur and Neckar rivers. It consists of the village of Ganterschwil and the hamlets of Äwil, Anzenwil, Bleiken, Ötschwil and Tobel as well as scattered individual farm houses.

Demographics

Historic Population
The historical population is given in the following chart:

Transport
Bütschwil-Ganterschwil sits on the Wil–Ebnat-Kappel line between Wattwil and Wil and is served by the St. Gallen S-Bahn at Bütschwil and Dietfurt.

Sights
The village of Bütschwil is designated as part of the Inventory of Swiss Heritage Sites.

References

External links

 
 

Municipalities of the canton of St. Gallen